Osredek pri Hubajnici is a small settlement southwest of Studenec in the Municipality of Sevnica in central Slovenia. The area is part of the historical region of Lower Carniola. The municipality is now included in the Lower Sava Statistical Region.

Name
The name of the settlement was changed from Osredek to Osredek pri Hubajnici in 1953.

Cultural heritage
An Early Iron Age burial ground with 37 burial mounds has been identified near the settlement.

References

External links
Osredek pri Hubajnici at Geopedia

Populated places in the Municipality of Sevnica